The discography of American rapper Cyhi the Prynce consists of 1 studio album, 12 singles, 6 mixtapes and 1 extended play.

Alongside his recording career, Cyhi has a prolific songwriting career, having co-written songs for artists including Kanye West, Travis Scott, and Sean Combs. These songs include, but are not limited to "All Day", "Famous" and "Father Stretch My Hands" by West, "Stargazing" and "No Bystanders" by Scott, and "Workin" by Combs.

Albums

Studio albums

Compilation albums

Mixtapes

Extended Plays

Singles

As lead artist

As featured artist

Other charted songs

Guest appearances

Notes

References

Discographies of American artists
Hip hop discographies